Hobart Romig Alter (December 13, 1897 – May 13, 1984)  was an American citrus grower and politician who served in the California State Assembly for the 72nd district from 1933 to 1935. During World War I, he served in the United States Army.

Alter was born in Washington County, Iowa, the son of E. R. Alter and Mabel Meacham. He died in Orange County, California, in 1984.

References

1897 births
1984 deaths
People from Washington County, Iowa
United States Army personnel of World War I
20th-century American politicians
Republican Party members of the California State Assembly